The Roman Catholic Archdiocese of Vienna is an archdiocese of the Catholic Church in Austria.  It was erected as the Diocese of Vienna on 18 January 1469 out of the Diocese of Passau, and elevated to an archdiocese on 1 June 1722.  The episcopal see resides in the cathedral of Stephansdom in Vienna.  The current bishop is Christoph Schoenborn, appointed in 1995 and elevated to cardinal in 1998.

The Archdiocese is the metropolitan diocese of three suffragan dioceses: Roman Catholic Diocese of Eisenstadt, of Linz, and of Sankt Pölten. These four dioceses together constitute the ecclesiastical province of Vienna, one of only two ecclesiastical provinces of Austria, the other under the Roman Catholic Archdiocese of Salzburg.

Episcopal Ordinaries

Suffragan Bishops of Vienna

 Leo von Spaur † (23 Dec 1471 Confirmed – 6 Mar 1479 Died)
 Georg von Slatkonia † (12 Aug 1513 Appointed – 26 Apr 1522 Died)
 Johann von Revellis † (6 Apr 1524 Confirmed – 27 Dec 1529 Died)
 Johann Fabri † (5 Dec 1530 Appointed – 21 May 1541 Died)
 Friedrich Nausea † (21 May 1541 Succeeded – 6 Feb 1552 Died)
 Antonín Brus von Muglitz, O. Cruc. † (17 Jul 1560 Appointed – 5 Sep 1561 Appointed, Archbishop of Praha {Prague})
 Johann Kaspar Neuböck † (4 Feb 1575 Appointed – 28 Aug 1594 Died)
 Melchior Klesl † (15 Jul 1613 Appointed - 18 Sep 1630 Died)
 Anton Wolfradt † (26 May 1631 Confirmed - 1 Apr 1639 Died)
 Philipp Friedrich von Breuner † (5 Sep 1639 Confirmed - 22 May 1669 Died)
 Wilderich von Walderdorff † (19 Aug 1669 Confirmed - 4 Sep 1680 Died)
 Emerich (Johann Anton) Sinelli, O.F.M. Cap. † (3 Mar 1681 Confirmed - 25 Feb 1685 Died)
 Ernst von Trautson zu Falkenstein † (10 Sep 1685 Confirmed - 7 Jan 1702 Died)
 Franz Anton von Harrach zu Rorau † (7 Jan 1702 Succeeded - 31 Jul 1706 Resigned)
 Franz Ferdinand von Rummel † (4 Oct 1706 Confirmed - 15 Mar 1716 Died)

Metropolitan Archbishops of Vienna

 Cardinal Sigismund Kollonitsch † (1 Jul 1716 Confirmed - 12 Apr 1751 Died)
 Cardinal Johann Joseph von Trautson zu Falkenstein (Trauston) † (12 Apr 1751 Succeeded - 10 Mar 1757 Died)
 Cardinal Christoph Bartholomäus Anton Migazzi † (23 May 1757 * Confirmed - 14 Apr 1803 Died)
 Sigismund Anton von Hohenwart, S.J. † (20 Jun 1803 Confirmed - 29 Jun 1820 Died)
 Leopold Maximilian Graf von Firmian (Frimian) † (25 January 1822 Appointed – 29 November 1831 Died)
 Vinzenz Eduard Milde † (27 October 1831 Appointed – 14 March 1853 Died)
 Cardinal Joseph Othmar von Rauscher † (20 March 1853 Appointed – 24 November 1875 Died)
 Cardinal Johann Baptist Rudolph Kutschker † (12 January 1876 Appointed – 27 January 1881 Died)
 Cardinal Cölestin Joseph Ganglbauer, O.S.B. † (23 March 1881 Appointed – 14 December 1889 Died)
 Cardinal Anton Josef Gruscha † (24 January 1890 Appointed – 15 August 1911 Died)
 Cardinal Franz Xavier Nagl † (5 August 1911 Succeeded – 4 February 1913 Died)
 Cardinal Friedrich Gustav Piffl † (1 April 1913 Appointed – 21 April 1932 Died)
 Cardinal Theodor Innitzer † (19 September 1932 Appointed – 9 October 1955 Died)
 Cardinal Franz König † (10 May 1956 Appointed – 16 September 1985 Retired)
 Cardinal Hans Hermann Groër, O.S.B. † (15 July 1986 Appointed – 14 September 1995 Retired)
 Cardinal Christoph Schönborn, O.P. (14 September 1995 Succeeded – present)

History

In 1642, St. Roch's Church was built in Vienna by Ferdinand III in thanks for the preservation of Vienna from the plague.

Notable people
Heinrich Maier, important resistance fighter against Nazi terror

See also
 Archbishop of Vienna
 Seminary of Vienna

References

External links
 GCatholic.org
 Catholic Hierarchy 

Roman Catholic dioceses in Austria
Religion in Vienna
1469 establishments in Europe
Roman Catholic dioceses established in the 15th century
 
Roman Catholic ecclesiastical provinces in Austria